This is a list of the properties and districts listed on the National Register of Historic Places listings in Onondaga County, New York. The locations of National Register properties and districts (at least for all showing latitude and longitude coordinates below) may be seen in a map by clicking on "Map of all coordinates". There are 170 properties and districts listed on the National Register in the county. Of those, 55 are outside the city of Syracuse, and are listed here, while the rest are covered in National Register of Historic Places listings in Syracuse, New York. One property, the New York State Barge Canal, spans both the city and the remainder of the county.

Current listings

Syracuse

Remainder of county

|}

See also

National Register of Historic Places listings in New York
List of National Historic Landmarks in New York

References

External links
A list of the above sites, with street addresses and other information, is available at Onondaga County, NY listing of National Register of Historic Places.Com, a private site serving up NRHP information.
The Greek Revival in Syracuse is an online book of Greek Revival architecture in Syracuse.

 
Onondaga